Josselyn is an unincorporated community in Dawson County, Nebraska, United States.

History
A post office was established at Josselyn in 1898, but it was discontinued in 1900. Josselyn was named for Simeon T. Josselyn, a railroad official who had received the Medal of Honor during the American Civil War.

References

Unincorporated communities in Dawson County, Nebraska
Unincorporated communities in Nebraska